Leslie Tibbott (born 25 August 1955) is a Welsh former footballer who played primarily as a left back. Born in Oswestry, England, Tibbott came through the Ipswich Town youth team before making his league debut in 1976. Tibbott contributed to Ipswich's victorious 1977-78 FA Cup campaign, making one appearance during the run against Cardiff City in the third round. However he was not part of the squad for the final itself. Winning two Wales under-21 caps while at Portman Road, Tibbot eventually signed for Sheffield United for £100,000 in March 1979.

Tibbott became a regular in the United side, playing in either defence or midfield, but the club were in decline and suffered two relegations during the period he was with them. With United now in Division Four, Tibbott started the 1980–81 season as first choice in midfield but becoming increasingly injury prone he was sidelined in September 1980 and failed to make another competitive appearance for the club.

Tibbot retired from playing in 1981 but made a brief return in 1985 when he became player-manager of Finnish side TP-Seinäjoki. He returned to Suffolk, playing for Stowmarket Town, before becoming assistant manager at Hadleigh United, also running a taxi firm in the town.

References

1955 births
Living people
Sportspeople from Oswestry
Welsh footballers
Welsh football managers
Association football defenders
Association football midfielders
Wales under-21 international footballers
Ipswich Town F.C. players
Sheffield United F.C. players
TP-Seinäjoki players
Stowmarket Town F.C. players
English Football League players
Expatriate footballers in Finland
TP-Seinäjoki managers